The 1958 Eisenhower Trophy took place 8–11 and 13 October on the Old Course in St Andrews, Scotland. It was the first World Amateur Team Championship for the Eisenhower Trophy. The tournament was a 72-hole stroke play team event with 29 four-man teams. The best three scores for each round counted towards the team total.

Australia won the Eisenhower Trophy, beating the United States by 222 to 224 in a playoff after both teams had finished on 918. The United States took the silver medal. Great Britain and Ireland finished a stroke behind and took the bronze medal while New Zealand, who led after 54 holes, finished fourth.

The playoff took place on Monday 13 October and followed the same format as the main event with the leading three scores counting. For Australia, Doug Bachli scored 77, Bruce Devlin 72, Bob Stevens 75 and Peter Toogood 75 for a total of 222. For the United States, Charles Coe scored 73, Bill Hyndman 78, Billy Joe Patton 75 and Bud Taylor 76 for a total of 224.

Teams
29 teams contested the event. Each team had four players with the exception of team Republic of China, which were represented by only three players.

Results

Playoff scores: : 222 (+6), : 224 (+8)

Individual leaders
There was no official recognition for the lowest individual scores.

Sources:

References

External links
Record Book on International Golf Federation website

Eisenhower Trophy
Golf tournaments in Scotland
Eisenhower Trophy
Eisenhower Trophy
Eisenhower Trophy